The Pira Paraná River is a river of the Vaupés Department, Colombia. It is a tributary of the Apaporis River.
 
People of the Eastern Tucano language group live along the river.

The main figure of the "Rock of Nyi", a group of several rocks with some petroglyphs standing near by the Equator, got a graffiti in the 1970s by a Protestant missionary.

See also
List of rivers of Colombia

References

Rivers of Colombia